Netherby is a village in the Harrogate  district of North Yorkshire, England.

Villages in North Yorkshire